Chief Dr. Emmanuel Iwuanyanwu  (born September 4, 1942) is a Nigerian politician and businessman, considered one of the richest men in Nigeria.

Biography
Iwuanyanwu was born on September 4, 1942 in Atta, Ikeduru local government area of Imo State of Nigeria. He studied civil engineering at the University of Nigeria and thereafter worked at the Hardel and Enic Construction Company, later acquiring it from the foreign operators. His business grew into a conglomerate of over 20 companies.

He had a promising political career and at different times ran for the office of the presidency of Nigeria. He also held several political offices for the Nigerian government, notably in sports administration and management of federal road maintenance. He is currently a member of the Board of Trustees of the ruling People's Democratic Party and coordinated the party's campaign for the South-East zone during the 2003 Presidential election.

He founded the Iwuanyanwu Nationale Football Club (now Heartland F.C.), which won several national and international championships.

As of March 2011 he has been the Executive chairman and publisher of Champion Newspapers.

His wife of more than 40 years, Lady Eudora Nnenna Ozinyereaku Iwuanyanwu, with whom he had three sons and five daughters, died on August 28, 2011, aged 63. She was described as "a critical success factor for her husband". Announcing her death, Chief Iwuanyanwu said: "As a Patron of Cancer Society, she had recently expressed great concern over the large number of deaths due to prostate cancer and all other kinds of cancer. At a recent family meeting, she convinced me to build and donate to Nigeria Ten (10) Cancer Screening and Treatment Centres, one in each of the Six Geo-Political Zones, and one in each of the 5 South-Eastern States. This was scheduled to be announced on the 4th of September, 2011. She died a week before."

As of March 2011, Iwuanyanwu was the Executive Chairman of Champion Newspapers, publisher of the Daily Champion newspaper.

References

External links
 Chief Dr. Emmanuel Chukwuemeka Iwuanyanwu website. (January 2012 archived copy)

Living people
1942 births
20th-century Nigerian businesspeople
21st-century Nigerian businesspeople
Igbo businesspeople
Igbo politicians
Nigerian newspaper publishers (people)
Peoples Democratic Party (Nigeria) politicians
University of Nigeria alumni